Events from the year 1725 in Ireland.

Incumbent
Monarch: George I

Events
June 24 – first recorded meeting of the Grand Lodge of Ireland in Dublin, making it the second most senior Grand Lodge in world Freemasonry, and the oldest in continuous existence.
Irish Presbyterian ministers who refuse to subscribe at ordination to the Westminster Confession form the Presbytery of Antrim.

Births
May 15 – James Fortescue, politician (d. 1782)
September 27 – Patrick d'Arcy, mathematician (d. 1779)
September 28 (possible date) – Arthur Guinness, brewer and founder of the Guinness Brewery business and family (d. 1803)
December 20 – John Parr, Governor of Nova Scotia (d. 1791)
Robert Hellen, English-born lawyer and politician (d. 1793)
Alexander McNutt, British Army officer and coloniser of Nova Scotia (d. 1811)

Deaths
March 31 – Henry Boyle, 1st Baron Carleton, Chancellor of the Exchequer of England and Lord Treasurer of Ireland (b. 1669)
April 16 – James Barry, politician (b. 1661)
December 26 – Katherine FitzGerald, Viscountess Grandison, heiress (b. 1660)
James Terry, Jacobite officer of arms.

References

 
Years of the 18th century in Ireland
Ireland
1720s in Ireland